Marolles may refer to the following places:

France
Marolles, Calvados, in the Calvados département 
Marolles, Loir-et-Cher, in the Loir-et-Cher département 
Marolles, Marne, in the Marne département 
Marolles, Oise, in the Oise département 
Marolles-en-Beauce, in the Essonne département 
Marolles-en-Brie, Seine-et-Marne, in the Seine-et-Marne département 
Marolles-en-Brie, Val-de-Marne, in the Val-de-Marne département 
Marolles-en-Hurepoix, in the Essonne département 
Marolles-lès-Bailly, in the Aube département 
Marolles-les-Braults, in the Sarthe département 
Marolles-les-Buis, in the Eure-et-Loir département
Marolles-lès-Saint-Calais, in the Sarthe département 
Marolles-sous-Lignières, in the Aube département 
Marolles-sur-Seine, in the Seine-et-Marne département

Belgium
Marolles (Brussels), a district in Brussels, Belgium

See also
Maroilles (disambiguation)
Marols, the dialect spoken in the Marolles district of Brussels